The Old Alexander House is a historic house on the campus of Southern Arkansas University in Magnolia, Arkansas.  Originally built in rural Columbia County in 1855 by Samuel Alexander, this single-story dogtrot house is one of the oldest buildings in the county, and one of its few surviving antebellum structures.

The house was listed on the National Register of Historic Places in 1979.  In 2017 it was moved from its rural location to the university campus, where it is slated to be used as part of its rural studies program.

See also
National Register of Historic Places listings in Columbia County, Arkansas

References

Houses on the National Register of Historic Places in Arkansas
Houses completed in 1855
Houses in Columbia County, Arkansas
National Register of Historic Places in Columbia County, Arkansas
1855 establishments in Arkansas
Dogtrot architecture in Arkansas
Southern Arkansas University
Relocated buildings and structures in Arkansas